Duane Darrin Mann (born 28 June 1965) is a New Zealand former rugby league footballer who played in the 1980s and 1990s, and coached in the 2000s. A Tonga and New Zealand international representative , he captained both sides. Mann played his club football for New Zealand sides Glenora, North Harbour, Auckland Warriors and Counties Manukau, as well as for English club, Warrington.

Background
Of Maori and Tongan descent, Mann was born in Auckland on 28 June 1965 into a family that already had a large presence in rugby league, with his father Don Mann representing New Zealand, his cousin Esau going on to play for Tonga, and his brother Don Jr., going on to work in administration at the New Zealand Warriors. He is also the cousin of fellow New Zealand and Tongan international, George.

Playing career

1980s
Mann attended Kelston Boys High School and played for the Glenora Bears from schoolboys right up to premier grade. When the Tonga national rugby league team was first formed to compete in the 1986 Pacific Cup he was selected to play in the side, making his international début.

Mann made his début for Auckland rugby league team in 1987 and played in their 30-14 win over Great Britain in 1988. He was also selected to represent Tonga at the 1988 Pacific Cup in Apia, Samoa. In 1989 Mann signed for the Warrington Wolves in the English Championship. During the 1989 Kangaroo tour of New Zealand he was selected to play for the Kiwis against Australia. From 1989 to 1993 Mann would play in 24 consecutive tests, including matches that formed part of the 1989–1992 World Cup.

1990s
During the 1990 Kangaroo tour of Great Britain and France he played for his club Warrington against Australia. Mann played  in Warrington's 12-2 victory over Bradford Northern in the 1990–91 Regal Trophy Final at Headingley, Leeds on Saturday 12 January 1991.

Mann played for three seasons in England before returning home to Auckland and playing a season for the North Harbour Sea Eagles who he captained to win the 1994 Lion Red Cup. In 1994 he was made captain of the New Zealand side. Mann was signed by the Auckland Warriors who were to enter the Australian Rugby League competition in 1995, and played in the club's inaugural match. That year he switched national allegiance back to Tonga whom he captained in both the 1995 and later the 2000 World Cup tournaments.

Mann left the Warriors in 1996 and returned to win the Lion Red Cup, as captain of the Counties Manukau Heroes. He captained and won three successive Fox Memorial Championships with the Glenora Bears in the 1997, 1998 and 1999 Auckland Rugby League competition and again represented Auckland in the 1997 Super League Challenge Cup.

Later life
Mann was occasionally involved in coaching with the Tongan national side, and in 2006 he was co-coach of the team that won the Pacific Cup. Mann has worked in the sport and education sector for over 15 years and has also run his own retail business and corporate training. Mann also served for a time as the New Zealand Warriors Junior Development Coach. In 2008 and 2009 he was the head coach of the Glenora Bears in the Auckland Rugby League. He has also held positions as the coaching development manager with Regional Sports Trusts and the Greater Auckland Coaching Unit, and New Zealand Rugby League's high performance director. Mann was previously Business & Sport Director and also Old Boys Chairman at Kelston Boys High School and occasionally works as a commentator and presenter on Sky TV. In 2010 and 2011 he was the head coach of the Bay Roskill Vikings.

References

1965 births
Living people
Auckland rugby league team players
Bay Roskill Vikings coaches
Counties Manukau rugby league team players
Glenora Bears coaches
Glenora Bears players
New Zealand national rugby league team captains
New Zealand national rugby league team players
New Zealand sportspeople of Tongan descent
New Zealand rugby league coaches
New Zealand rugby league commentators
New Zealand rugby league players
New Zealand Warriors captains
New Zealand Warriors players
North Harbour rugby league team players
Rugby league hookers
Rugby league players from Auckland
Tonga national rugby league team captains
Tonga national rugby league team coaches
Tonga national rugby league team players
Warrington Wolves players